Charlie Rakotoariventiny (born c. 1954) is a Malagasy politician.  He is a member of the Senate of Madagascar for Itasy, and is a member of the Tiako I Madagasikara party.

References

1950s births
Living people
Members of the Senate (Madagascar)
Tiako I Madagasikara politicians
Place of birth missing (living people)